Members of the New South Wales Legislative Assembly who served in the 52nd parliament held their seats from 1999 to 2003.  They were elected at the 2003 state election, and at by-elections. The Speaker was John Murray.

See also
Third Carr Ministry
Results of the 1999 New South Wales state election (Legislative Assembly)
Candidates of the 1999 New South Wales state election

References

Members of New South Wales parliaments by term
20th-century Australian politicians